The Second Album is the second album by the British band the Spencer Davis Group, released in 1966. Many of the songs were a slightly experimental blend of beat, folk, jazz and blues. The album included Jackie Edwards' "Keep on Running", which gave the group their first U.K. number 1 single, and the R&B standard "Georgia on My Mind". The album spent eighteen weeks on the U.K. album chart, peaking at number 3. While the album was not released in the US, the single "Keep on Running" was released in February, 1966, and spent four weeks on the Billboard Hot 100 chart peaking at number 74 on March 12. Other tracks from this album were later released in the U.S. on various compilations of the band.

Although never released in America, all but four tracks ("Strong Love", "I Washed My Hands In Muddy Water", "Since I Met You Baby", and "You Must Believe Me") were released on the group's American albums. "Strong Love" was released on compilation albums, Canada in 1967 and the US in 1984 respectively.

Track listing

Side one

 "Look Away" (Norman Meade, Bert Russell) – 2:45
 "Keep on Running" (Jackie Edwards) – 2:51
 "This Hammer" (Muff Winwood, Steve Winwood, Pete York, Spencer Davis) – 2:19
 "Georgia On My Mind" (Hoagy Carmichael, Stuart Gorrell) – 4:44
 "Please do Something" (Don Covay) – 2:27
 "Let Me Down Easy" (Dee Dee Ford) – 3:06

Side two

 "Strong Love" (Deadric Malone, Edward Silvers, Mary M. Brown) – 2:18
 "I Washed My Hands In Muddy Water" (Joe Babcock) – 2:38
 "Since I Met You Baby" (Ivory Joe Hunter) – 3:30
 "You Must Believe Me" (Curtis Mayfield) – 2:49
 "Hey Darling" (Davis, S. Winwood) – 4:49
 "Watch Your Step" (Bobby Parker) – 2:57

Personnel

The Spencer Davis Group
 Steve Winwood – lead guitar, lead vocals (1-7, 10-12), organ, piano
 Spencer Davis – rhythm guitar, backing and lead (8, 9) vocals
 Muff Winwood – bass guitar
 Pete York – drums, percussion

Technical
 Chris Blackwell – producer
 Clifford Jones – photography
 Chris Welch – liner notes

References

Fontana Records original record sleeve notes

External links
http://www.allmusic.com/album/second-album-r34791

1966 albums
The Spencer Davis Group albums
Albums produced by Jimmy Miller
Albums produced by Chris Blackwell
Fontana Records albums